Nicola Tiggeler (born 1 April 1960 in Hanover) is a German actress, singer, dancer and acting teacher.

Personal life

During her theater engagement in Augsburg, Tiggeler met the fellow actor Timothy Peach, with whom she has been married since 1988. Both are also ambassadors of the SOS Children's Village e.V. Tiggeler and Peach live in Munich and have two children.

References

External links 

 

1960 births
Living people
Actors from Hanover
German film actresses
German television actresses